The NST Niigata Open was a professional golf tournament that was held in Japan. It was a Japan Golf Tour event from at least 1981 to 2004. It was sponsored by Niigata Sogo Television and played on different courses in Niigata. The tournament record of 264(-24) was set in 2001 at Nakajo Golf Club.

Winners

Notes

References

External links
Coverage on Japan Golf Tour's official site

Golf tournaments in Japan
Former Japan Golf Tour events
Recurring sporting events established in 1978
Recurring sporting events disestablished in 2004